Afghanistan competed in the 2017 Summer Deaflympics which was held in Samsun, Turkey. Afghanistan sent a team consisting of 5 athletes for the event. This was the country's first appearance at the games, having only becoming a member of the Deaflympics in 2013.

Participants

Athletics

Taekwondo

References 

Afghanistan
Afghanistan at the Deaflympics